Jonatan da Silva Lima, known as Jonatan or Jonatan Lima (born 4 January 1992) is a Brazilian professional footballer who plays for Greek Super League 2 club Kifisia.

Club career
He made his Campeonato Paulista debut for Guaratinguetá on 23 February 2012 in a game against Catanduvense.

References

External links
 

1992 births
Sportspeople from Salvador, Bahia
Living people
Brazilian footballers
Association football midfielders
Associação Atlética Flamengo players
Guaratinguetá Futebol players
Sociedade Esportiva e Recreativa Caxias do Sul players
Associação Desportiva Recreativa e Cultural Icasa players
Ituano FC players
Veranópolis Esporte Clube Recreativo e Cultural players
Associação Portuguesa de Desportos players
Criciúma Esporte Clube players
Grêmio Novorizontino players
FC Lviv players
FC Kremin Kremenchuk players
Mesaimeer SC players
Campeonato Brasileiro Série B players
Campeonato Brasileiro Série C players
Campeonato Brasileiro Série D players
Ukrainian Premier League players
Qatari Second Division players
Brazilian expatriate footballers
Expatriate footballers in Ukraine
Brazilian expatriate sportspeople in Ukraine
Expatriate footballers in Qatar
Brazilian expatriate sportspeople in Qatar